Virbia varians is a moth in the family Erebidae first described by William Schaus in 1892. It is found in Peru.

References

varians
Moths described in 1892